The Pendine Museum of Speed was dedicated to the use of Pendine Sands for land speed record attempts. It was opened in 1996 in the village of Pendine, on the south coast of Wales, and was owned and run by Carmarthenshire County Council. The museum received 33,522 visitors in 2009.

Babs was excavated in 1969 after 42 years of burial on the beach at Pendine Sands, and restored over the following 16 years by Owen Wyn Owen.

In 2018 it was decided to replace the 1990s museum building, at a cost of £7 million. As of February 2021, the museum was closed and demolished, with a replacement under construction, whose opening date is yet to be confirmed. Babs was on display at Beaulieu Motor Museum until February 2019, but as of May 2019 was being maintained and no longer on display.

See also
 British land speed record

References

External links

 Pendine Museum of Speed at the Pendine Community Council website (as at January 2021)
Pendine Museum of Speed at the Pendine Community Council website (2018 archive)

Automobile museums in Wales
Transport museums in Wales
Museums in Carmarthenshire
Sports museums in Wales